The 2018 CONMEBOL Recopa was the 26th edition of the CONMEBOL Recopa (also referred to as the Recopa Sudamericana, or ), the football competition organized by CONMEBOL between the winners of the previous season's two major South American club tournaments, the Copa Libertadores and the Copa Sudamericana.

The competition was contested in two-legged home-and-away format between Brazilian team Grêmio, the 2017 Copa Libertadores champions, and Argentinian team Independiente, the 2017 Copa Sudamericana champions. The first leg was hosted by Independiente at Estadio Libertadores de América in Avellaneda on 14 February 2018, while the second leg was hosted by Grêmio at Arena do Grêmio in Porto Alegre on 21 February 2018.

Tied 1–1 on aggregate, Grêmio won 5–4 on penalties to win their second Recopa Sudamericana title.

Format
The Recopa Sudamericana was played on a home-and-away two-legged basis, with the Copa Libertadores champions hosting the second leg. If tied on aggregate, the away goals rule would not be used, and 30 minutes of extra time would be played. If still tied after extra time, the penalty shoot-out would be used to determine the winner. If extra time was played, a fourth substitution would be allowed.

Teams

Venues

Matches

First leg

Second leg

See also
2017 Copa Libertadores Finals
2017 Copa Sudamericana Finals

References

2018
2018 in South American football
Grêmio Foot-Ball Porto Alegrense matches
Club Atlético Independiente matches
2017–18 in Argentine football
2018 in Brazilian football
Football in Avellaneda
February 2018 sports events in South America
International club association football competitions hosted by Argentina
International club association football competitions hosted by Brazil
Association football penalty shoot-outs